Good to Know is the fourth studio album by American singer-songwriter JoJo. The album was released on May 1, 2020, marking JoJo's first release since leaving Atlantic Records and launching her own record label imprint Clover Music through a joint venture with Warner Records. The album's first single "Man" was released on March 13, 2020, along with the song's accompanying music video. The promotional single, "Lonely Hearts", was released on April 24, 2020. It received critical acclaim from contemporary music critics, with many praising its mature tone as well as JoJo's musical and vocal growth. An acoustic version of the album was released on July 10, 2020, assisted by the release of the acoustic version of "Think About You", and later, JoJo would release a deluxe edition of the album on August 28, 2020. The deluxe edition was preceded by the release of a new single, "What U Need". The deluxe edition also included a remix of "Lonely Hearts" featuring American singer Demi Lovato.

Concept and title 
On February 21, 2020, JoJo revealed that the album, titled Good to Know, was scheduled for a second quarter release in spring that year. "I called the album good to know because of everything I've learned in the past few years – every piece of feedback, criticism (internal or external), whatever it is – it's all just information. And it's all good! I've been lucky to have the space to reflect on my own journey up to now, and I hope people can take comfort in the fact that I am not anywhere near perfect, and I will never sugarcoat anything. We are all constantly living and learning, and that's what makes this life so fun."

Songs
“So Bad" is a "silken, spacy track", containing "aquatic keyboards" and "thud-knocking beats" and introduces the album's themes of control and command. "Pedialyte" is a "gritty song", with "talk-like verses" and "relaxed vocals with a truly unforgettably catchy chorus" that we just know we’re going to have stuck in our heads for the rest of the day. The ending of this track includes an outro. "Gold" is an old-school R&B, love track with extreme sultriness.

Cancelled tour
On February 21, 2020, JoJo announced her planned to embark on a worldwide headlining and third major world tour in support of her fourth studio album a concert tour titled The Good to Know Tour. The multi-city tour will travel throughout North America and Europe with the first leg of the tour largely takes place in North America and will begin on April 21 at the Showbox in Seattle and travels to theatres across the country stopping in Portland, San Francisco, Los Angeles, San Diego, Atlanta, Chicago, Houston and more wrapping up in Minneapolis, MN on May 30. The tour will continue traveling across the UK in the following months beginning in Dublin, Ireland on Aug 31, before concluding on Sep 25 in Stockholm, Sweden. However, the singer announced her tour has been postponed due to the COVID-19 pandemic. Later, in January 2021, JoJo announced that the tour it was officially cancelled due to the unpredictable nature of the pandemic.

Critical reception

Writing for Variety, A.D. Amorosi highlighted the singer's maturity "it's the album where all of her tics – of rushing too many breathy rap-sung syllables into one phrase, overly dreamy production and voluminous multi-tracked harmonies – have become agreeable signatures. JoJo sounds right on time: she's grown into herself." He still added the album comes across like an update of Janet Jackson's Control in a weird way, especially its simmering, slow closer "Funny How Time Flies (When You're Having Fun) "from its cultured chord changes and hushed emotive vocals to its clicking rhythms and orchestrated synths" Mike Wass from Idolator said the album is elevated by JoJo's growth as a vocalist "in much the same way that Mariah Carey purposely dialed it back a notch in the ’90s to focus on agility and delivery, there isn't an unnecessary note on this album. It's one thing to be able to sing well, it's another to make people feel it. And that's exactly what JoJo does on Good To Know."

Writing for This Is R&B, Dai Poole praised JoJo's growth as a vocalist and storyteller "each ad-lib and melisma feels deliberate [...] Each song on this album could stand on its own, but collectively they create an experience. If Good To Know is a snapshot of JoJo’s life these past few years, we can’t wait for our next musical conversation with the talented star. Sean Maunier from Metro Weekly said the album finds JoJo sounding relaxed, at ease with herself, and its assured tone nicely complements its self-love vibes "it may be a one-note album, but it delivers plenty of good feelings packaged with low synths, slick R&B production and some truly head-turning vocals."

Writing for The Irish News, Edd Dracott said the album feels both classic to her style and an evolution of her work at different moments "there is a depth and reflective mood as well, with her nimble voice celebrated in the lighter-raising Small Things and matched with booming bass and samples in Think About You. This is R&B with style and thought.". Nick Smith from MusicOMH noted how JoJo has matured both musically and vocally "some of the raw lyrics here will sledgehammer that point home, even if they detract from the material a little. The underlying message here appears to be one of self-acceptance being possible through the unravelling of toxic relationships. Some brilliant sonic touches coupled with canny and self-assured slams add up to a sound and credible return".

Aimee Cliff from The Guardian said with its themes of independence and self-knowledge, the album carries with it a sense that she has finally arrived as the kind of artist she was always meant to be, "slowed down to a treacle pace and layered in indulgent harmonies, these bass-rich songs are the most mature JoJo has ever recorded. It's a hangover album (one spacious, swirling song is named Pedialyte, for the rehydration drink), all about making clear-eyed assessments of past bad decisions in the light of day. Her voice, always impressive, is now an intimidating muscle, and while her message occasionally brushes against empowerment-pop cliché, the naked passion in her vocal sells every line."

Commercial performance
Good To Know debuted at number 33 on the US Billboard 200 with 12,700 album-equivalent units on its first week, which consisted 8,000 pure album copies and 3,400 streaming units The album also charted at number 19 on the Top R&B/Hip-Hop albums chart.

Track listing
Credits adapted from the album's liner notes.

Notes
  signifies a co-producer
  signifies an additional producer
  signifies a vocal producer
  "Pedialyte" contains elements from "Feasing" written by Silvano Chimenti and Enrico Pieranunzi, and "Surf Club 76BPM" written by Tobias Brewer. The outro contains a hidden track titled "Take Me" commencing at approximately three minute and fourteen seconds (3:14) into the track.
”Comeback” samples “Some Cut” by Trillville & an contains an interpolation of “The Take” by Tory Lanez.
"What U Need" contains a sample of "Let Me Know" by Galimatias
 On digital standard versions of the album, "Comeback" features Tory Lanez and 30 Roc, while physical standard versions and digital deluxe versions of the album feature a solo version.

Personnel
Credits adapted from album's liner notes. All track numbers refer to the physical release of the album.

 30 Roc – producer 
 A Pluss – producer , programming 
 Beatgodz – producer 
 Dale Becker – mastering 
 Merna Bishouty – vocal producer 
 Daniel Brooks – engineer , additional engineering 
 Stephen "Thundercat" Bruner – bass 
 Jon Castelli – mixing 
 Miles Comaskey – mix engineer 
 DatBoiSqueeze – producer 
 Natalie Dunn – vocal producer 
 Wissam Ghorayeb – engineer 
 Jason Gilbert – engineer 
 Ryan Gladieux – engineer , mixing 
 JoJo – vocals , vocal producer 
 Najeeb Jones – assistant mix engineer 
 Wow Jones – additional production 
 Jordan XL – producer, instruments, and programming 
 Johan Lenox – additional production 
 Lido – producer , additional production 
 Fade Majah – producer 
 Tony Maserati – mixing 
 Rob McCurdy – guitar 
 Doc McKinney – producer 
 James Musshorn – engineer 
 Noise Club – producer , programming 
 Tommy Parker – vocal producer 
 Chris Petrosino – keyboards 
 Santell – co-producer 
 Tyler Scott – mix engineer 
 Dylan Wiggins – producer 
 Jamar Williams – engineer 
 David K. Younghyun – assistant mix engineer

Charts

Release history

References

2020 albums
Clover Music albums
JoJo (singer) albums
Warner Records albums